Emerson Swinford, a native of Chicago, is a Los Angeles-based guitarist, composer/songwriter and producer. He is currently a guitarist in the Rod Stewart band, and was formerly a member of the band Drill, a precursor to industrial-nu metal group Static-X.

Career 
Swinford's guitar work can be heard on the 2018 album release by Stewart, called Blood Red Roses, the 2015 release Another Country and 2013's Time.  Blood Red Roses and Time both went to number 1 on the UK Albums Chart. Another Country has since reached Platinum sales and Time has achieved Double Platinum sales status there. Time also went to number 7 on the US Billboard chart. Emerson has numerous co-writing credits with Stewart including "Honey Gold", "Vegas Shuffle", as well as co-writing "The Drinking Song". Along with writer/producer Kevin Savigar and Rod Stewart, Emerson co-wrote two songs on the Time album, "Finest Woman" and the title track "Time".

In 2016 he released a self-titled album available on his website and on iTunes. Emerson's theme and under-score music composed for the hit comedy Hot in Cleveland won him ASCAP Film and Television Music Awards in 2011, 2012, and 2014.  He is also a composer for the TV Land network comedy series The Soul Man and Retired at 35 and has had many TV and film song placements including The Hills, The Ghost Whisperer, and The Tonight Show with Jay Leno. As a session guitarist, Emerson has recorded with a diverse roster of artists such as Jennifer Love Hewitt, Delerium, Rod Stewart, Paul Oakenfold, Liz Phair, Jim McGorman, P. J. Olsson, Fisher (band), Kimberley Locke, Natalie Cole, Kenny G and many others, as well as performing on the soundtracks for the movies Just Like Heaven, Planet of the Apes and Power Rangers. His guitar work is also featured on several national TV commercial spots including St. Ives and Coors Light. Emerson is a co-writer of the hit single "Barenaked" for actress and singer Jennifer Love Hewitt. He was the musical director and touring guitarist for Tony award-winning actress and singer Idina Menzel, famous for her roles in Disney's Frozen, Broadway's Wicked and Rent, and the TV show Glee.

Selected discography

Main source for discography:

References

External links

"emersonswinford.com
"Emerson Swinford AllMusic.com

Year of birth missing (living people)
Living people
Songwriters from Illinois
American male composers
21st-century American composers
Record producers from Illinois
Guitarists from Chicago
American male guitarists
James B. Conant High School alumni
21st-century American male musicians
American male songwriters